Michael A. Turner (born June 5, 1963), also known as Emtee, is an English-born Canadian musician and producer. He is best known as the former lead guitarist and founding member of the band Our Lady Peace and current member of alternative rock supergroup Crash Karma.

Life and career
Born on June 5, 1963, in Halifax, England, Turner grew up heavily influenced by punk rock. His first guitar was a gift from his mother on his seventeenth birthday. He played in a variety of bands during the 1980s.

Turner moved to Ontario, Canada at the age of eighteen. He studied English literature at the University of Western Ontario. He lived in Saugeen-Maitland Hall at the University of Western Ontario along with fellow Our Lady Peace band member Duncan Coutts.

Our Lady Peace

1991–2001
In late 1991, Turner placed an ad in Toronto-based Now newspaper in search of musicians. Michael Maida, a criminology student at the University of Toronto, was the first to reply.  The two formed a band called As If, inviting Jim Newell as drummer and a friend of Turner's, Paul Martin, to play bass. After they played a number of gigs in Oshawa with sets containing a mix of original and cover material, Martin departed soon after, and the band placed an ad for a replacement bassist. Chris Eacrett, a business student at Ryerson University, replied and was accepted after an audition. During that time, Turner and Maida attended a music seminar where they met songwriter and producer Arnold Lanni, the owner of Arnyard Studios. The band, with Lanni, commenced writing new material and recorded some material under the As If name.

Soon thereafter, the band's name was changed to Our Lady Peace, with Maida changing his first name to Raine to avoid confusion, after a Mark Van Doren poem of the same name.  It took the band eventually a year and half of constant back and forth talks with Sony to secure a record deal. With encouragement from their producer Lanni and his management team, the band performed some gigs in Eastern Ontario and Montreal in conjunction with The Tea Party eventually supporting acts.  It was not until Robert Plant of Led Zeppelin heard a song of OLP on the radio that he asked them to be a support on his tour. and Alanis Morissette.

Turner left Our Lady Peace in late 2001, citing musical and creative differences. Following his departure he stated that he and the band were growing in different directions. Many attribute OLP's lack of commercial success after 2001 due to the band losing their raw, post-grunge sound that Turner brought to the band.

2021–present
In the summer of 2021, Our Lady Peace frontman Raine Maida announced that Mike Turner was involved with the production of their tenth studio album, Spiritual Machines 2. Maida stated that it wouldn't "be right" to make a sequel to Spiritual Machines without Turner. The first Spiritual Machines album, released in 2000, was the last Our Lady Peace studio album Turner had been fully involved with prior to his original 2001 departure from the band.

Turner was also a featured special guest during Our Lady Peace's 2022 cross-country "The Wonderful Future Theatrical Experience" live tour, where he appeared in holographic form as well as performed live on stage at select venues. It was Turner's first time playing live with the band in over 20 years.

Crash Karma, other projects
After his 2001 departure from Our Lady Peace, he began producing music and played guitar in the Canadian band Fair Ground, with Harem Scarem guitarist Pete Lesperance. Turner was approached by Amir Epstein of Zygote and Edwin of I Mother Earth about forming a band after they met while recording in Turner's Toronto based studio. With the addition of Jeff Burrows of The Tea Party, Crash Karma released their first single "Awake" in 2009 followed by a debut album in March 2010.

Inspired by his work with producers Arnold Lanni and Bob Rock, he became very interested in the production side of music, and decided to produce and write full-time.

He experimented with live recordings, using a small mobile recording rig of his own design. He also built a private recording studio in his home, taking on projects for labels like Capitol, EMI and Sony. Turner then opened a public recording studio in Toronto called The Pocket with a few partners from the music industry. The partnership has since dissolved although Turner remains active at the studio hosting diverse artists including Alert the Medic, Shaye, Luke Doucet, Hawksley Workman, Sloan, and Feist. Recordings from The Pocket, with Turner producing have won two Canadian Broadcast awards, one in 2009 for "Afflicted" by Age of Days and again in 2011 for Crash Karma as Rock Group of the Year.

Contributions and awards

Discography

Our Lady Peace
Naveed (1994)
Clumsy (1997)
Happiness... Is Not a Fish That You Can Catch (1999)
Spiritual Machines (2000)
Gravity (2001)
Spiritual Machines 2 (2021)

Fair Ground
Down In It (2006)

Crash Karma
Crash Karma (2010)
Rock Musique Deluxe (2013)

Award wins and nominations

References 

1963 births
Living people
Crash Karma members
English male guitarists
English male singers
English rock guitarists
English emigrants to Canada
Musicians from Bradford
Musicians from Toronto
University of Western Ontario alumni
Our Lady Peace members
20th-century English singers
21st-century English singers
20th-century British male singers
21st-century British male singers